In mathematics, given a vector at a point on a curve, that vector can be decomposed uniquely as a sum of two vectors, one tangent to the curve, called the tangential component of the vector, and another one perpendicular to the curve, called the normal component of the vector. Similarly, a vector at a point on a surface can be broken down the same way.

More generally, given a submanifold N of a manifold M, and a vector in the tangent space to M at a point of N, it can be decomposed into the component tangent to N and the component normal to N.

Formal definition

Surface
More formally, let  be a surface, and  be a point on the surface. Let  be a vector at  Then one can write uniquely  as a sum

 

where the first vector in the sum is the tangential component and the second one is the normal component. It follows immediately that these two vectors are perpendicular to each other. 

and thus

where "" denotes the dot product. Another formula for the tangential component is 

where "" denotes the cross product.

Note that these formulas do not depend on the particular unit normal  used (there exist two unit normals to any surface at a given point, pointing in opposite directions, so one of the unit normals is the negative of the other one).

Submanifold
More generally, given a submanifold N of a manifold M and
a point , we get a short exact sequence
involving the tangent spaces:

The quotient space  is a generalized space of normal vectors.

If M is a Riemannian manifold, the above sequence splits, and the tangent space of M at p decomposes as a direct sum of the component tangent to N and the component normal to N:

Thus every tangent vector  splits as
,

Computations
Suppose N is given by non-degenerate equations.

If N is given explicitly, via parametric equations (such as a parametric curve), then the derivative gives a spanning set for the tangent bundle (it is a basis if and only if the parametrization is an immersion).

In both cases, we can again compute using the dot product; the cross product is special to 3 dimensions however.

Applications
 Lagrange multipliers: constrained critical points are where the tangential component of the total derivative vanish.
 Surface normal
 Frenet–Serret formulas
 Differential geometry of surfaces#Tangent vectors and normal vectors

References

 Benjamin Crowell (2003) Light and Matter. (online version).

Differential geometry